Sophronisca brunnea is a species of beetle in the family Cerambycidae. It was described by Per Olof Christopher Aurivillius in 1927.

Subspeciea
 Sophronisca brunnea atricornis Breuning, 1956
 Sophronisca brunnea brunnea Aurivillius, 1927

References

Desmiphorini
Beetles described in 1927